Chen Xiao (born 10 August 1989 in Dezhou, Shandong) is a Chinese football player who currently plays for China League One side Jiangxi Beidamen.

Club career
Chen Xiao started his professional football career in 2008 when he was promoted to Guizhou Zhicheng's first squad. On 22 January 2014, Chen signed for China League One side Yanbian FC.

On 17 February 2016, Chen transferred to Chinese Super League side Hangzhou Greentown. On 6 March 2016, Chen made his Super League debut in the first match of 2016 season against Changchun Yatai, coming on as a substitute for Oh Beom-seok in the 77th minute.

Career statistics
Statistics accurate as of match played 31 December 2020.

Honours

Club
Yanbian FC
 China League One: 2015

References

External links
 

1989 births
Living people
Chinese footballers
Footballers from Shandong
Guizhou F.C. players
Yanbian Funde F.C. players
Zhejiang Professional F.C. players
Hebei F.C. players
Chinese Super League players
China League One players
China League Two players
Association football defenders
People from Dezhou